Friso was a legendary Frisian king.

Friso can also refer to:

People

Surname
John William Friso, Prince of Orange and Stadtholder of Friesland and Groningen.

First name
Prince Friso of Orange-Nassau, second son of Queen Beatrix of the Netherlands and Claus von Amsberg.
Friso Nijboer, a Dutch chess player.